Elections for the members of the House of Representatives were held on June 6, 1922, pursuant to the Philippine Organic Act of 1902, which prescribed holding elections every three years. The ruling Nacionalista Party was split into the Colectivista (headed by Manuel Quezon) and the Unipersonalista (headed by Sergio Osmeña) factions. If combined, both blocs formed the largest party grouping in the House, with 64 of the 93 members. The Democrata Party emerged as the strongest opposition party since then Progresistas of the 1910s, winning 25 seats.

Results

Note

A.  The combined number of seats of the Nacionalista Party before it was divided into two factions.

References

  

1922
History of the Philippines (1898–1946)
1922 elections in Asia
1922 in the Philippines